Catherine of Taranto (sometimes Caterina d'Enghien Orsini del Balzo) was the daughter of Mary of Enghien and Raimondo Orsini del Balzo di Nola and sister of Giovanni Antonio Orsini del Balzo.

She married the knight Tristan de Clermont (1380 – ), a member of the French family of Clermont-Lodève, who became Count of Copertino as part of her dowry.

She and Tristan had two daughters: 
Isabella of Clermont (c. 1424 – 30 March 1465), who became Queen of Naples and Jerusalem by marriage to Ferdinand I of Naples, illegitimate son of King Alfonso V of Aragon.
Sancia di Chiaromonte (died 30 March 1468), Countess of Copertino and Lady of Nardò. In 1436 she married Francesco II del Balzo (1410–1482), 3rd Duke of Andria, who became Count of Copertino as part of her dowry.

15th-century Italian nobility

Catherine
Princesses of Taranto
15th-century Italian women
Year of birth unknown
Year of death unknown